Lieutenant Roy O. Hesketh (1915 in Pietermaritzburg, South Africa – 19 September 1944, above Great Bitter Lake, Egypt) was a South African racing driver and South African Air Force pilot.

Lieutenant Roy Hesketh died in Egypt in an aircraft collision in the Second World War. The Roy Hesketh Circuit in Pietermaritzburg was named after him.

He was buried at the Fayid War Cemetery in Fayid, Egypt.

References

External links 
 http://www.djrun.co.za/Roy_Hesketh.html Vive le Roy! – Roy Hesketh

1915 births
1944 deaths
Aviators killed in aviation accidents or incidents
People from Pietermaritzburg
South African Air Force personnel of World War II
South African Air Force officers
South African military personnel killed in World War II
South African racing drivers
Victims of aviation accidents or incidents in Egypt
Victims of aviation accidents or incidents in 1944